The dwarf false catshark (Planonasus parini) is a species of ground shark, which lives in the Indian Ocean near Socotra. This species is one of two known members of its genus, the other being the pygmy false catshark off the coast of India, Sri Lanka, and the Maldives. The pygmy false catshark is very closely related to the dwarf false catshark, but has some morphological differences. Two examples are its absence of an oral papillae and that it has more tooth rows in the lower jaw.

References

Pseudotriakidae

Fauna of Socotra
Fish described in 2013